Tetratricopeptide repeat and ankyrin repeat containing 1 is a protein that in humans is encoded by the TRANK1 gene.

Disease Linkage
Through a Genome-wide association study, TRANK1 has been relationed with the Bipolar disorder.

References

Further reading 

 
 

Genes
Human proteins